The Hefei–Wuhan railway is a  high-speed railway in Chinese provinces of Anhui and Hubei, with trains running from Anhui's capital Hefei to Hubei's capital Wuhan.

As of July 2010, scheduling systems showed nine daily D-series express trains running in each direction between Hefei and Wuhan's three train stations (Wuhan, Hankou, and Wuchang), making the trip in 2 hours to 2 hrs 40 min. Another six Shanghai-Wuhan D-series trains passed this section without stopping in Hefei.

This railway is one of the sections of the important east-west route known as the Shanghai–Wuhan–Chengdu High-Speed Railway (Shanghai–Hankou–Chengdu).

The railway uses tunnels when crossing the Dabie Mountains on the Anhui–Hubei border.

References

High-speed railway lines in China
Railway lines opened in 2009
2009 establishments in China
Rail transport in Anhui
Rail transport in Hubei